Celebest Football Club is a football club based in Palu, Central Sulawesi, Indonesia that competes in Liga 3. Nicknamed Tanduk Anoa, the club was founded as Villa 2000 Football Club based in Pamulang, South Tangerang, changed its name to Celebest in 2016 and moved to its current stadium, Gawalise Stadium, in the same year.

History 
Abdee Negara Nurdin, the frontman of Slank is an important person behind the formation of Celebest FC. Because of his love for his hometown, Abdee with PT. CELEBEST INDONESIA ANDAL as a legal entity of Celebest FC, was determined to bring back the glory of the Sulawesi football, particularly in Indonesia.

February 11, 2016 was approved as the official foundation for Celebest CF, after the acquisition of ownership of the club Villa 2000 FC.

Name Celebest FC have been selected for developing football in Sulawesi, particularly in Palu and raise Sulawesi in National and International Football.

2016 became the starting point Celebest FC competed in the competition of football Indonesia, Indonesia Soccer Championship B. The squad of players that exist in Celebest FC is a young talent that has been selected at Palu, Manado, Makassar, Majene, and some young players from Villa 2000.

Stadium 

Celebest plays their home matches at Gawalise Stadium after moving their homebase from Pamulang to Palu.

Sponsorship 
 Indofood
 Corsa Tire
 Mogu Mogu
 bareksa.com

Players

Current squad

Personnel

Coaching staff
 Manager Coach : I Wayan Arsana
 Coach : Firdaus Kindo
 Coach : Rauf Haci
 Coach : Akbar N.

Official staff
 Takbir Larakeng
 Ahmadi
 Indrawan Kusuma Putra
 Thamrin Tahir
 Hikmatyar
 Imam Rizaldy
 Isrin Hasjim
 dr. Ricky Yulian

References

External links
Official website
Celebest F.C. on Twitter
 

Palu
Football clubs in Indonesia
Football clubs in Central Sulawesi
Association football clubs established in 2016
2016 establishments in Indonesia